Yana Urqu (Quechua yana black, urqu mountain, "black mountain", also spelled Yana Orkho) is a mountain in the Bolivian Andes which reaches a height of approximately . It is located in the Cochabamba Department, Carrasco Province, Pocona Municipality. It lies north of the Wanaku Mayu ("guanaco river").

References 

Mountains of Cochabamba Department